Kamila Przyk is a Polish ice dancer. Her partner was Sławomir Janicki.

Competitive highlights

References

Polish female ice dancers
Living people
Place of birth missing (living people)
Year of birth missing (living people)